King's Casino may refer to:

 King's Casino Rozvadov, a casino located in Rozvadov, Czech Republic 
 Kings Club Casino, a casino located in Brimley, Michigan, United States